The coastal cisticola (Cisticola haematocephalus), also known as the umbabird, is a species of bird in the family Cisticolidae. It is found on the coastal plain of East Africa.

Alternate common names are Mombasa black-backed cisticola.

Taxonomy
The coastal cisticola is monotypic. This taxon was split from the winding cisticola by the IOC and HBW, as were the rufous-winged cisticola, Luapula cisticola and Ethiopian cisticola. The Clements (2017) and Howard and Moore (2014) world lists consider these taxa as a single species, the winding cisticola C. galactotes (sensu lato).

Distribution and habitat
This species is found on the coastal plain of East Africa between 5°N to 10°S (southern Somalia to north-eastern Tanzania).

Its natural habitats are tropical seasonally wet or flooded lowland grassland and swamps.

References

External links

coastal cisticola
Birds of East Africa
coastal cisticola